The economy of the Gambia is heavily reliant on agriculture.  The Gambia has no significant mineral or other natural resources, and has a limited agricultural base. About 75% of the population depends on crops and livestock for its livelihood. Small-scale manufacturing activity features the processing of peanuts, fish, and animal hides.

Short-run economic progress remains highly dependent on foreign aid, and on responsible government economic management as forwarded by International Monetary Fund technical help and advice.

Economic history 
Current GDP per capita of the Gambia registered a peak growth of 23.3% in the 1970s. Economic growth slowed by 8.30% in the 1980s and a further 5.20% in the 1990s.

Re-export trade normally constitutes a major segment of economic activity, but the 50% devaluation of the CFA franc in January 1994 made Senegalese goods more competitive and hurt the re-export trade. The Gambia has benefited from a rebound in tourism after its decline in response to the military's takeover in July 1994.

Macro-economic trend
This is a chart of trend of gross domestic product of Gambia at market prices estimated by the International Monetary Fund with figures in millions of Dalasi (currency used in Gambia).

For purchasing power parity comparisons, the US dollar is exchanged at 4.35 Dalasi only.

The Gambia's economy is characterized by traditional subsistence agriculture, a historic reliance on peanuts or groundnuts for export earnings, a re-export trade built up around its ocean port, low import duties, minimal administrative procedures, a fluctuating exchange rate with no exchange controls, and a significant tourism industry. Average wages in 2007 hover around $1–2 per day.

Economic sectors

Agriculture 

Agriculture accounts for 23% of gross domestic product (GDP) and employs 75% of the labor force. Within agriculture, peanut production accounts for 5.3% of GDP, other crops 8.3%, livestock 4.4%, fishing 1.8%, and forestry 0.5%.

Industry 
Industry accounts for 12% of GDP. Manufacturing accounts for 6% of GDP. The limited amount of manufacturing is primarily agriculturally based (e.g., peanut processing, bakeries, a brewery, and a tannery). Other manufacturing activities include soap, soft drinks, and clothing. Services account for 19% of GDP.

Tourism 

Tourism in Gambia has three major strands. There is the traditional sun seeking holiday making use of the hot climate and wonderful beaches. The Gambia is also usually the first African destination for many European birders, due to its easily accessed and spectacular avian fauna. There are also a significant number of African Americans tracing their roots in this country, from which many Africans were taken during the slave trade.

The tourist season is the dry season, during the Northern Hemisphere winter.

Trade 
In 2020 The Gambia's major export markets were Senegal, Mali, Guinea-Bissau, India and China, accounting for 84% of all exports. Neighboring Senegal accounted for 50.5% of exports. This contrasted with 1999 when the UK and other EU countries were The Gambia's major domestic export markets, accounting for 86% of all exports.

In 2020 Norway, China, Cote d'Ivoire, Brazil and Turkey were the major sources of imports, accounting for 49% of the total. This contrasted with 1999 when the UK and other EU countries were the major sources of imports, accounting for 60% of all imports.

Statistics

GDP:
purchasing power parity $2.264 billion (2008 est.)
real growth rate: 5.5% (2019 est.)
per capita: purchasing power parity - $1,300 (2008 est.)
composition by sector:
agriculture: 33%
industry: 8.7%
services: 58.3% (2008 est.)

Inflation rate (consumer prices): 6.5% (2019 est.)

Labor force: 400,000

Labor force - by occupation: agriculture 75%, industry, commerce, and services 19%, government 6%

Budget:
revenues: $88.6 million
expenditures: $98.2 million, including capital expenditures of $ (Not Available) (FY96/97 est.)

Industries: processing peanuts, fish, and hides; tourism; beverages; agricultural machinery assembly, woodworking, metalworking; clothing

Electricity
production: 75 GWh, entirely from fossil fuels (1998)
consumption: 70 GWh (1998)
Electricity is not imported or exported from the Gambia.

Agriculture - products: peanuts, pearl millet, sorghum, rice, maize, cassava (tapioca), palm kernels; cattle, sheep, goats; forest and fishery resources not fully exploited.

Exports: $132 million (f.o.b., 1998)
commodities: peanuts and peanut products, fish, cotton lint, palm kernels.
partners: Benelux 78%, Japan, United Kingdom, Hong Kong, France, Spain (1997)

Imports: $201 million (f.o.b., 1998)
commodities: foodstuffs, manufactures, fuel, machinery and transport equipment.
partners: Hong Kong, United Kingdom, Netherlands, Ivory Coast, France, Senegal, Belgium (1997)

Debt - external: $430 million (1997 est.)

Economic aid - recipient: $45.400 million (1995)

Currency: Dalasi (D)

Exchange rates:
dalasi (D) per US$1 – 43.860 (January 2017), 11.626 (November 1999), 10.643 (1998), 10.200 (1997), 9.789 (1996), 9.546 (1995)

Fiscal year: 1 July - 30 June

See also

Transport in the Gambia
Telecommunications in the Gambia
Mining industry of the Gambia
 United Nations Economic Commission for Africa

References

Further reading
 Sternfeldt, Ann-Britt. (2000). The Good Tourist in the Gambia: Travelguide for Conscious Tourists. Translated from Swedish by Rolli Fölsch. TheGoodTourist. Sexdrega, Sweden. .

External links
 
 The Gambia latest trade data on ITC Trade Map
 Company formation Gambia

 
Gambia
Gambia, The